The Rajendra Place Metro Station is located on the Blue Line of the Delhi Metro.

Station layout

Connections

See also
List of Delhi Metro stations
Transport in Delhi

References

External links

 Delhi Metro Rail Corporation Ltd. (Official site) 
 Delhi Metro Annual Reports
 

Delhi Metro stations
Railway stations opened in 2005
Railway stations in Central Delhi district